Darul Takzim may refer to:
 Johor Darul Ta'zim F.C., a football club based in Johor, Malaysia
 Johor Darul Takzim, a state of Malaysia